"Seek truth from facts" is a historically established idiomatic expression (chengyu) in the Chinese language that first appeared in the Book of Han. Originally, it described an attitude toward study and research.

In modern Chinese culture 
The slogan became a key element of Maoism, first quoted by Mao Zedong during a speech at the Sixth National Congress of the Chinese Communist Party in 1938, in reference to pragmatism. Mao had probably remembered it as being the inscription on his alma mater, Hunan's First Teachers Training School. Beginning in 1978, it was further promoted by Deng Xiaoping as a central ideology of Socialism with Chinese characteristics, and applied to economic and political reforms thereafter.

Use in political context 

On 11 May 1978 journalist Hu Fuming published an article in Guangming Daily entitled "Practice is the Sole Criterion for Testing the Truth"（）directly contradicting then CCP general secretary Hua Guofeng's line of the "Two Whatevers" policy and thereby Mao Zedong's policy of class struggle in favour of economic reform championed by Deng Xiaoping. The title of the article is inspired by the saying and is widely seen as a seminal document in Chinese history marking the beginning of the Reform and Opening Up era.

References 

Chinese proverbs
Economic history of the People's Republic of China
Ideology of the Chinese Communist Party
Maoism
Slogans